Bolshoye Krotovo is a rural locality (a village) in Pinezhsky District, Arkhangelsk Oblast, Russia. The population was 39 as of 2012.

Geography 
Bolshoye Krotovo is located 21 km northeast of Karpogory (the district's administrative centre) by road. Vaymusha is the nearest rural locality.

References 

Rural localities in Pinezhsky District